Brunswick Town is an area in Hove, in the city of Brighton and Hove, England. It is best known for the Regency architecture of the Brunswick estate.

History 
Originally, the area had been part of Wick Farm. In the late 18th and early 19th centuries, nearby Brighton had become very fashionable. The Kemp Town estate there had been a success in 1824 architect Charles Busby entered into an agreement to build a similar development on land lying at the extreme east of Hove, adjacent to Brighton. The name "Brunswick" was taken from House of Brunswick, a term sometimes used for the House of Hanover, the name of the British royal family at the time.

Brunswick Town was built as a collaborative project between Busby and the landowner, the Reverend Thomas Scutt. Construction started in 1824. The first houses were completed by 1826. Busby designed Brunswick Town as a long row of terraced houses facing the sea. In the middle point of this sea-facing terrace was a central square, which stretched back. This square was named Brunswick Square. The terraced houses, in Brunswick Terrace and in Brunswick Square, were built for the upper classes, they were designed as 'first-class' housing. Beyond these houses were second-class houses in streets such as Waterloo Street.

The early 20th century saw the area enter decline. At the extreme eastern edge of Brunswick Terrace, on the border of Hove and Brighton, the modernist Embassy Court apartment block was completed in the 1930s, envisaged by local politicians such as Sir Herbert Carden as the beginning of a transformation of the entire seafront, which would have entailed the obliteration of Brunswick Terrace. By the late 1940s Brunswick Square itself had become so run-down that the Council was considering wholesale demolition and redevelopment with modern housing. These plans encountered strong local opposition, in particular through the founding of the Regency Society which fought successfully against the plans. 
 
In the late 1990s the top of Brunswick Square, where it meets busy Western Road, was closed to motor traffic, changing the nature of the square from a through route to a residential area. The Embassy block was also redeveloped, having fallen into decay.

Notable residents

Brunswick Square and Brunswick Terrace have had a large number of prominent residents. 
 Henry Brougham, 1st Baron Brougham and Vaux
 James Brudenell, 7th Earl of Cardigan
 Roger Quilter, composer
 John Horace Round, historian
 Robin Maugham, writer
 Robert Bevan, artist
 Philip Salomons, financier, who built a Roof-top synagogue at 26 Brunswick Terrace
 Admiral Sir George Augustus Westphal, served in over 100 actions and wounded at Trafalgar on HMS Victory lived at No 2 Brunswick Square 1836-1875
 Sir Winston Churchill was schooled in Hove in the Brunswick area between 1883 and 1885.
 Edward Carpenter, English socialist poet, socialist philosopher, anthologist, and early gay activist
 Nick Tyson, the curator of The Regency Town House, a heritage centre at No.13

Politics
Brunswick is currently part of the local council's Brunswick & Adelaide ward which is represented by two Green councillors, Phélim Mac Cafferty and Hannah Clare. Phélim was first elected to the ward in May 2011 alongside former councillor Ollie Sykes, gaining it from the Liberal Democrats.

Culture
The Brunswick Festival takes place each year, centred on Brunswick Square. The Old Market, built in 1828 to serve Brunswick Town, was restored in 1999 and is used as a theatre.

Listing designations

Many of the buildings in the area are listed by Historic England. Some are listed at the highest grade, Grade I. These include the four components of Brunswick Terrace; Nos 1-6, Nos 7-19, Nos 20-32, and Nos 33-42; the East, and West sides of Brunswick Square, and the Church of St Andrew.

Gallery

See also
 Landmarks and notable buildings of Brighton and Hove

Footnotes

References

Sources

External links
 Brunswick on My Brighton and Hove
 Regency Town House
 The Old Market — a history of the market and its later use as a riding school
 Brunswick Square and Terrace Residents' Association
 East Brunswick Residents' Association

Areas of Brighton and Hove
Hove
Conservation areas in England